The following lists events that happened during 1956 in South Africa.

Incumbents
 Monarch: Queen Elizabeth II.
 Governor-General and High Commissioner for Southern Africa: Ernest George Jansen.
 Prime Minister: Johannes Gerhardus Strijdom.
 Chief Justice: Albert van der Sandt Centlivres.

Events
February
 1 – The South African government requests the Soviet Union to withdraw its consulates.

March
 16 – The Riotous Assemblies Act no. 17 is passed, prohibiting any outside gathering that the Minister of Justice deems a threat to public peace.
 17 – Mimi Coertse makes her Vienna State Opera debut as Queen of the Night in The Magic Flute (Mozart).

August
 9 – Women's march on the Union Buildings in Pretoria in protest against the pass laws.

December
 5 – 156 leading activists are arrested, heralding the start of the Treason Trial. Among those arrested is Lillian Masediba Ngoyi.
 19 – The Four year long Treason Trial begins at the Drill Hall in Johannesburg.

Unknown date
 Lillian Masediba Ngoyi is elected president of the Federation of South African Women.
 Lillian Masediba Ngoyi becomes the first woman to be elected to the African National Congress National Executive Committee.
 Segregation is introduced on buses.
 Albert Lutuli is arrested.

Births
 31 January – Trevor Manuel, politician.
 2 February – Zweli Mkhize, politician, national minister
 17 April – Jerry Mofokeng, actor.
 29 May – Anant Singh, film producer, and businessman.
 10 July – Solomon Mahlangu, Umkhonto we Sizwe operative
 26 July – Gordon Igesund, football coach.
 1 September – Jeremy Baskin, trade unionist and labour market analyst.
 30 October – Nick Mallett, Springboks player & Springboks coach.
 13 November – Nosiviwe Mapisa-Nqakula, politician, national minister
 15 December – Tony Leon, politician.
 16 December – Duncan Faure, musician, member of Rabbitt.
 23 December – Andre Markgraaff, Springboks coach.

Deaths
 5 April - Manilal Gandhi, editor, activist, and second son of Mahatma Gandhi, (b. 1892)

Sports
South Africa at the 1956 Summer Olympics

References

History of South Africa